The Alzaiem Alazhari University located in Khartoum North, Sudan. It was established in 1993 in memory of Ismail al-Azhari.

It is a member of the Federation of the Universities of the Islamic World.

Faculties 
 Engineering
 Medicine
 Agriculture
 Medical Laboratory Sciences
 Medical Sciences
 Medical Radiologic Sciences
 Computer Science and Information Technology
 Economics and Administrative Sciences
 Education
 Political Sciences
 Urban sciences
 Law
 Technical Studies

Faculty of Medical Sciences 
The faculty,  established by decree of the university council on 28 February 2001, has three departments - Anesthesia department which offers bachelor's degree of anesthesia, Nursing, and Midwifery.

Campuses 
There are four campuses:
 Central campus in  Khartoum Bahri
 Al-Abasia campus
 Wd-Nubawi campus
 Al-Tijani Hilal campus
 Kafori campus

References 

Khartoum North
Universities and colleges in Sudan
Science and technology in Sudan
Scientific organisations based in Sudan
Education in Khartoum